The Reconstruction Acts, or the Military Reconstruction Acts (March 2, 1867, 14 Stat. 428-430, c.153; March 23, 1867, 15 Stat. 2-5, c.6; July 19, 1867, 15 Stat. 14-16, c.30; and March 11, 1868, 15 Stat. 41, c.25), were four statutes passed during the Reconstruction Era by the 40th United States Congress addressing the requirement for Southern States to be readmitted to the Union. The actual title of the initial legislation was "An act to provide for the more efficient government of the Rebel States" and was passed on March 4, 1867. Fulfillment of the requirements of the Acts was necessary for the former Confederate States to be readmitted to the Union from military and Federal control imposed during and after the American Civil War. The Acts excluded Tennessee, which had already ratified the 14th Amendment and had been readmitted to the Union on July 24, 1866.

Background 
Reconstruction first began under the Union Army, which implemented policies conducive to their military goals. The succession of Andrew Johnson to the Presidency following the assassination of Abraham Lincoln was initially supported by Radicals in Congress, who thought Johnson's policies would be more punitive and far reaching than Lincoln's. However, the Radicals disapproved of how Johnson took a conciliatory approach and inflicted almost no punishment on the South, and how Johnson permitted Southern states to pass the Black Codes and to elect former Confederates to Congress. Johnson sought to finish Reconstruction by December 1865, before Congress would meet again. When Congress met in 1866, they overturned all of the President's decisions related to reconstruction, barring delegations from the Southern States from entering the Congress, and passing the Freedmen's Bureau Bill and the Civil Rights Act of 1866, both over Johnson's veto. Johnson's hostility to Congressional plans led to growing discontent in Congress with his administration. The midterm elections of 1866 produced a resounding endorsement of Radical policy and a rejection of Johnson's, effectively leaving Johnson powerless to slow down the plans of the Radical Congress. Support grew among Congressional Republicans to wipe away the current Johnson state governments and their abuses and to create new governments.

History
The passage of the Reconstruction Acts marks the beginning of Congressional Reconstruction. The Acts set forth the requirements for the late rebel states to regain entry into the Union. For reentry, each state had to draft a new state constitution, which would have to be approved by Congress. These constitutions would have to enfranchise the freedmen and abolish the Black Codes. A key addition of the Acts included the creation of five military districts in the South, each commanded by a general, which would serve as the highest authority for the region, though few generals were actively involved in day to day affaires, especially after new constitutions were passed. The states were also required to ratify the Fourteenth Amendment to the United States Constitution. President Andrew Johnson's vetoes of these measures were overridden by Congress. The Military Reconstruction Acts served to greatly increase the power of the Federal government over that of the States, and were perceived by most Southerners as justifying antebellum worries about the potential of Northern sectional dominance leading into the Civil War.

Each Military Reconstruction Act had slightly different requirements for readmission to the Union, and were successively passed in response to various political developments in the Southern States. For example, the earlier acts required that the new State Constitutions be approved by a popular vote, earning the approval of a majority of the population registered to vote (mostly freed blacks and non-confederate whites). In Mississippi, where the State's proposed Constitution was overwhelmingly hated by the public, the opponents of the new Constitution refused to vote, making it impossible for a majority of registered voters to approve of the State Constitution. In response, the Radical Congress passed another Reconstruction Act, changing the requirement  for a new Constitution to require only a majority of actual voters to approve. Because opponents of the Reconstruction Constitution didn't vote, the majority of actual voters were in favor, and the Constitution was automatically ratified. Congressional actions like this served to drastically lower the trust of Southerners in the Federal Government.

General George Meade (of the Third Military District) appointed Brig. General Thomas H. Ruger
to replace Governor of Georgia Charles J. Jenkins, who had been elected as the only candidate in 1865 to succeed James Johnson, who had been appointed by President Andrew Johnson.

After Ex parte McCardle (1869) came before the United States Supreme Court, Congress feared that the Court might strike the Reconstruction Acts down as unconstitutional. To prevent this, Congress repealed the Habeas Corpus Act 1867, eliminating the Supreme Court's jurisdiction over the case.

See also
 Reconstruction Amendments
 First Military District (Virginia)
 Second Military District (North Carolina, South Carolina)
 Third Military District (Georgia, Alabama and Florida)
 Fourth Military District (Arkansas and Mississippi)
 Fifth Military District  (Texas and Louisiana)

References

Further reading
 Kevin J. Coleman (2015): The Voting Rights Act of 1965: Background and Overview (PDF). This Congressional Research Service document describes at its pages 4–5 the four Reconstruction Acts passed in 1867 and 1868 in the context of the United States reconstruction after the end of the Civil as envisioned by the United States Congress. Archived from the original on June 22, 2021.

External links
 

39th United States Congress
40th United States Congress
1867 in American law
1867 in American politics
1868 in American law
1868 in American politics
Andrew Johnson administration controversies
Political repression in the United States
Reconstruction Era legislation
United States constitutional law
United States federal legislation